The Ogaden National Liberation Front (abbreviated ONLF,) is a social and political movement, founded in 1984 to campaign for the right to self-determination for Somalis in the Somali Region of Ethiopia. Its armed wing, the Ogaden National Liberation Army (ONLA), waged a violent insurgency against the Ethiopian government from 1994 to 2018.

Ceasefire and peacemaking efforts
The ONLF declared a unilateral ceasefire on 12 August 2018. 

On 4 November 2020 ONLF issued a statement on the current war in Ethiopia, calling on all concerned parties to 'immediately cease the current hostilities', they also called on the international community to 'spare no effort in helping parties find a peace settlement'.

Background

The ONLF, established in 1984, demanded for the autonomy of this region and has claimed responsibility for several attacks since the beginning of 1994 aimed at Ethiopian forces in the area, which the government considers a region under the new federal system. 

The area of the Somali region stretches at least about 330,000 square kilometres and has over 3 million people, mainly from the Absame Somali tribe. The ONLF claims that Ethiopia is an occupying government, despite the Ogaden being represented in the Ethiopian federal government by groups including the opposition Somali People's Democratic Party (SPDP). 

The ONLF is composed mainly of members of the Ogaden clan, specifically "the makaahiil tribe of the Ogaden". The armed wing of the ONLF was the Ogaden National Liberation Army (ONLA). In October 2018, ONLF signed a peace agreement with the federal government and ceased hostilities, with former fighters beginning the process of societal reintegration.

History 

The ONLF was founded in 1984 by six people: Abdirahman Mahdi, the Chairman of the Western Somali Liberation Movement Youth Union, Mohamed Ismail Omar of the Western Somali Liberation Front (WSLF), Sheikh Ibrahim Abdalla Mohamed (WSLF), Abdi Ibrahim Ghehleh (WSLF-Trade Union), Abdirahman Yusuf Magan (WSLF) and Abdulahi Muhammed Sa'adi (WSLF). The ONLF is currently led by Chairman Mohammed Omar Osman, who was elected to the post at a 1998 national convention.

ONLF was formed after the defeat of Somalia in the 1977 Ogaden War. ONLF systematically recruited WSLF members and replaced WSLF in the Ogaden as Somalian support for the WSLF dwindled and finally ended in the late 1980s. By the time Mengistu regime fell, the ONLF had fully consolidated its position among ethnic Somalis in Ogaden, and joined the Transitional Government. The ONLF announced elections in December 1992 for District Five (what became the Somali Region) in Ethiopia, and won 80% of the seats of the local parliament. ONLF nominated Abdullahi Muhumed Sa'di for the Region's presidency, and other members for the vice-presidency and the Executive body; the regional parliament elected them in a majority vote. ONLF elected officials ruled the territory until the transitional government ended with the adoption of a new constitution. At that time the ruling Ethiopian People's Revolutionary Democratic Front pushed for a new partner in the region, which led to the founding of the Ethiopian Somali Democratic League (ESDL) at Hurso in 1993. The ESDL then won the Somali seats in the 1995 general elections, pushing the ONLF out of power. The ONLF then accused the Ethiopian government of oppressing its members, while ONLF was accused of killing other Somali politicians and elders.

In 2005 Ethiopia proposed peace talks with ONLF. ONLF accepted on the condition that talks be held in a neutral country and with the presence of a neutral arbiter from the international community, but the talks broke down due to Ethiopia's insistence that the two parties meet directly in a location in or around the Horn of Africa. ONLF became a part of the Alliance for Freedom and Democracy on May 22, 2006 but the alliance has not achieved any progress since its creation.

On 12 August 2006, 13 members of the ONLF were killed and several commanders were claimed captured as they crossed into Ethiopia from Somalia. The ONLF repudiated this claim, stating that it was intended to reassure prospective oil prospecting companies from Malaysia and China that Ethiopia is in control of the Ogaden territory.

The ONLF continues to operate in the Ogaden . The Ethiopian military has stepped up its actions against ONLF following the organizations stated that it would attack the Malaysian oil company Petronas, which plans to extract oil from the Ogaden Basin. Even though there are some developments including a new university in the Somali state region, new schools, hospital and Somali language television programs, full development has been restrained in the area because of the fighting between ONLF and government forces.

Ogadenia confusion 

The ONLF mostly recruits from the Ogaden (clan) of  Somali people, which constitutes roughly 2/3 of the regional population. However, many other Somali clans and sub-clans reside in the area, and animosity between the pro-ONLF Ogadenis and other Somali clans in the area remains very deeply rooted. For many, calling the region "Ogaden" is "rightly or wrongly, associated with majority rule by the Ogaden clans, respectively with their claim for power within the Somali Regional State". The Ethiopian government has exploited these rivalries by arming minority Somali militias to fight the majority ONLF. Yet, some Ogaden members have pushed for other Somali clans getting represented in the regional government. Writer Mohamed Mohamud Abdi states that the territory has been under occupation since the Scramble for Africa, and that the inhabitants have been unable to choose their own name Ogadenia for the land.

Groundwork for an independent state 

Supporters of the ONLF generally aspire to create an independent, sovereign Somali-majority state consisting primarily of what is now Ethiopia's Somali Region. ONLF supporters generally refer to the entire area of this future state as Ogaden or Ogadenia even though the name is controversial among some groups because of its clan-affiliation.

The ONLF ostensibly exists to allow the inhabitants of Ethiopia's Somali Region the ability to freely determine their own future and has thus has taken few public positions with regards to how a future state of Ogadenia would be administered. That said, the ONLF has fostered the creation of a national consciousness among Ethiopia's Somali inhabitants by adopting a national flag for Ogadenia and promoting an Ogaden national anthem, Qaran (before the adoption of Qaran, the Ogaden national anthem used by some separatists was Abab).

Furthermore, the ONLF has an official political programme in which it commits to, among other things, protecting freedom of religion, democratic activity, and the women, children, and minorities of Ogaden.

Border issues 
The nomadic lifestyle of Somali people has led to their occupation of disproportionally larger territory than other ethnic groups in the Horn of Africa who have greater populations than Somalis, especially the neighboring Oromos. Small and big conflicts have occurred between Somalis, Oromos and Afars in the disputed border regions for several centuries. The Somali region of Ethiopia, often labeled Ogaden, also used to be known as Hararghe in the pre-1991 map of Ethiopia. The pre-1991 map showed Somalis inhabiting a large part of today's northeast Oromia, while the post-1991 map shows the Ogaden region occupying Oromia's pre-1991 Bale region. Ogaden nationalists have stated that Dire Dawa and various towns, including Mieso, Bardoda, Babille, Fanyaanbiiro, Jinacsani and other regions, were incorporated into Oromia by the Oromo Peoples' Democratic Organization (OPDO) following a 2004 plebiscite. Some Oromo liberation fighters believe a large chunk of Ogaden's territory belongs to them. In February 2009, 300 people were killed and over 100,000 people displaced during a conflict outside the border town of Moyale between an Oromo clan and a Somali clan.

Pan Somali 

Unlike other Ethiopian ethnic groups like the Oromo and Gurage, the Somali ethnic group in general (and the Ogaden sub-clan in particular) do not have religious diversity. Around 99% of the Ogaden people practice Islam.

Effects on Ethiopia and the Somali Civil War 

On November 28, 2006, the ONLF threatened that it would not allow Ethiopian troops to stage into Somalia from their territories. On December 23, the ONLF claimed to have attacked an Ethiopian column near Baraajisale heading to Somalia, destroying 4 of 20 vehicles, inflicting casualties and driving the convoy back. No independent source has confirmed the attack.

On January 10, 2007, ONLF condemned Ethiopia's entry into the War in Somalia, stating that Meles Zenawi's invasion of Somalia demonstrated that his government had been an active participant in the Somali conflict with a clear agenda aimed at undermining the Somali sovereignty. On January 15, ONLF rebels attacked Ethiopian soldiers in Kebri Dahar, Gerbo, and Fiq. Five Ethiopian soldiers and one ONLF rebel were reported killed.

War crimes allegations

In their 2008 report 'Collective Punishment' Human Rights Watch made a catalogue of war crimes and crimes against humanity by the Ethiopian government including; 
 forced evacuation
 killings
 burning of villages 
 rape and sexual violence 
 arbitrary detention
 abuse and torture of detainees 
 execution of detainees 
 forced recruitment of pro-government militias 
 confiscation of livestock
 trade embargo  
 restrictions on movement, herding and access to water sources 
 restrictions on humanitarian assistance

According to the Chicago Tribune, "As of 2007, human rights groups and media reports accuse Ethiopia – a key partner in Washington's battle against terrorism in the volatile Horn of Africa – of burning villages, pushing nomads off their lands and choking off food supplies in a harsh new campaign of collective punishment against a restive ethnic Somali population in the Ogaden, a vast wilderness of rocks and thorns bordering chaotic Somalia". 

In April 2007, the Ethiopian government imposed a total commercial trade embargo on the war-affected area of the Somali Region (the Fiq, Degehabur, Gode, Korahe, and Werder Zones, where the Ogadeni Somali live), prohibiting all commercial truck movement in the region and across the border into Somalia, as well as the free movement of livestock by foot. 

A tightly restricted and monitor tour by western journalist in the embattled region on the invitation of the regional administration reported on more alleged crimes by the Ethiopian government. A report by a Newsweek reporter detailed how Ethiopian military troops stormed a village southeast of Degahabur, accused the villagers of sympathizing with the ONLF, then razing the village and torturing and murdering many of the inhabitants.

Obale Raid, subsequent conflict 

On April 24, 2007, members of the ONLF attacked a camp for employees of Zhongyuan Petroleum Engineering, a Chinese oil exploration company, in Obale, Somali Region, killing approximately 65 Ethiopians and 9 Chinese nationals.

The ONLF claimed it had "completely destroyed" the camp. Most of the Ethiopians killed in the attack were daily laborers, guards and other support staff. Some members of the Ethiopian security officials were also killed during the surprise attack however those killed by the ONLF included 30 civilians, the ONLF attack was perpetuated as the ONLF has a policy of not allowing the Ethiopian government to extract resources as this will not be shared with the impoverished and suppressed population of the Ogaden, the Ogaden is largely a marginalized region as rebels have battled successive governments claiming discrimination and most recently crimes against humanity this was backed by a human rights watch report into alleged abuses. It was the most deadly single attack by the ONLF. On April 27, Ethiopian government spokesperson reported that ONLF rebels had detonated a "grenade," killing one person who was attending a funeral of family member killed during the prior attack.

Shortly after the attack, the Ethiopian Army launched a military crackdown in Ogaden. The latest action of this crackdown resulted in the death of foreign relations chief Dr. Mohamed Sirad Dolal at the town of Danan as he met with other ONLF members. Reportedly this has led to the ONLF splitting into two factions, with one group allied to current ONLF chairman Mohammed Omar Osman, and the other led by senior leader Abdiwali Hussein Gas, who appointed Salahudin Ma'ow as the new ONLF chairman and declared that he will "bring Mohammed Omar Osman to court".

Somali deaths 

In May 2007, a grenade attack by ONLF rebels in the Somali region of Ethiopia claimed the lives of at least 11 Somalis. During a national holiday ceremony held at the Ogaden town of Jijiga, the grenade thrown at the podium of the stadium also wounded Somali regional president Abdulahi Hassan Mohammed in the leg. Bereket Simon, an adviser to Prime Minister Meles, blamed the ONLF as well as Eritrea since it arms the ONLF. However, the ONLF denied the accusations. The bombing triggered a huge stampede in the stadium which led to the death of around six children.

Ethiopia says dozens more Somali civilians have been killed by ONLF over the years, including women and children.

Discovery of oil 

As of 2009, no oil has been found in the Ogaden. The U.S. Energy Information Administration has been quoted as estimating that Ethiopia has 428,000 barrels of crude oil reserves. However, experts believe the real prize is the estimated 4 trillion cubic feet of natural gas. This potential has drawn large companies such as Petronas from Malaysia and Lundin Petroleum, based in Sweden, to the inhospitable and nearly roadless Ogaden. Various media sources have wrongly stated that there is oil in Ogaden but there has been no oil discovery in the Ogaden. Contrary to popular claims, the Ogaden region is a resource poor desert and has lacked development for centuries under nomadic tribes that the federal Ethiopian government receives very little income from the region. Due to the nomadic nature of the natives and due to the ONLF insurgency, the current Ethiopian government is said to spend a large portion of the budget for infrastructure development in the Ogaden region despite the government getting proportionally very little tax revenue from the locals.

Other ONLF attacks 

An ONLF grenade attack on a cultural gathering in Jijiga killed four middle school students on May 28, 2007. In a separate attack, fifty civilians were injured, including the regional president Abdullahi Hassan, and three artists were killed on May 28, 2007 by the ONLF.

An ONLF attack on the town of the Debeweyin woreda in the Korahe Zone also left ten civilians dead, including two schoolteachers and a pregnant woman. A second attack on the town of Shilavo left five civilians dead, while an ONLF-planted landmine near Aware in the Degehabur Zone exploded, killing three civilians traveling by automobile. Another ONLF unit struck in the district of Lahelow near the Ethiopia-Somalia border, targeting members of the Isma'il Gum'adle sub-clan, twelve of whom were slain. Regional security chief Abdi Mohammed Omar asserted that over a two month period, some 200 civilians had been killed by the ONLF.

Ethiopia has been recently accused of human rights abuses. In response, the Ministry of Foreign Affairs says there is a double standard on terrorism since the ONLF group has killed many Ethiopians and Western nations have not condemned its killings. Ethiopia has been described as a partner in the United States fight against terrorists, including al Qaeda.

In a communique, the ONLF claimed to have captured seven towns in the Somali Region on 10 November 2009 after two days of heavy fighting. The ONLF reported these towns as: Obolka, near Harar; Hamaro, east of Fiq; Higlaaley and Gunogabo near Degehabur; Yucub, 40 kilometers from Werder; Galadiid, 35 kilometers from Kebri Dahar; and Boodhaano near Gode. Bereket Simon denied to Reuters that the ONLF had succeeded in capturing any towns, adding, "Their attacks last week were simply the desperate act of a dying force and about 245 of their fighters were killed."

Notes and references

External links
List: Ogaden-Somali Members of Ethiopian Parliament
Ogaden community/Somali state website
Ogaden Community Website
ONLF Website
Ogaden Today
Ethiopia: External and Internal Opponents, Library of Congress
United Nations Emergency Unit for Ethiopia report, 1994
Ogaden news website
"In the shadow of Ethiopia's rebels" by Elizabeth Blunt, BBC News, 14 August 2007
 ONLF leader, Abdirahman Sheikh Mahdi,
Council on Foreign Relations Backgrounder: Ogaden National Liberation Front (ONLF)

1984 establishments in Ethiopia
Ethnic political parties in Ethiopia
Factions of the Ethiopian Civil War
Formerly banned socialist parties
History of Ethiopia
Insurgency in Ogaden
Members of the Unrepresented Nations and Peoples Organization
National liberation armies
National liberation movements in Africa
Political parties in Ethiopia
Politics of Ethiopia
Rebel groups in Ethiopia
Separatism in Ethiopia
Socialist parties in Ethiopia
Somali Region